Jasper Adams (August 27, 1793 – October 25, 1841) was an American clergyman, college professor, and college president.

Early years
Adams was born in East Medway, Massachusetts, on August 27, 1793, son of Major Jasper Adams and Emma Rounds, and a direct descendant from Henry Adams. He was graduated from Brown University in 1815, studied at Andover, Massachusetts, theological seminary, from 1816 to 1817.

He received the degree of A.M. from Yale in 1819 and that of S.T.D. from Columbia in 1827.

Career
He was a teacher at Phillips Academy of Andover for three years, tutor at Brown, 1818 to 1819, and becoming a professor of mathematics and natural philosophy there, from 1819 to 1824. Adams was ordained in the Protestant Episcopal Church, as a deacon on September 2, 1819, and priest on August 4, 1820.

He became the president of College of Charleston, South Carolina, in 1824, leaving the post temporarily in 1826 to become the president of Geneva College, New York, now called Hobart College, and returned to the presidency of the College of Charleston in 1828, remaining there through 1838.

During this period he wrote the Elements of Moral Philosophy, published in 1837. He was elected a Fellow of the American Academy of Arts and Sciences in 1835.

Last years
In 1838, he became a chaplain and a professor of geography, history and ethics, at the West Point, New York, a position he retained through 1840, when became principal of the seminary at Pendleton, South Carolina, until his death there on October 25, 1841.

Adams was a Freemason, member of Mt. Vernon Lodge No. 4 in Providence, Rhode Island.

Writings by Jasper Adams
 "The Relation of Christianity to Civil Government in the United States" (1833), in The Sacred Rights of Conscience, edited by Daniel L. Dreisbach and Mark David Hall (Indianapolis: Liberty Fund, 2009): 597–610.

References

Sources
  
Who Was Who in America: Historical Volume, 1607-1896.  Chicago: Marquis Who's Who, 1963.

External links
  Elements of Moral Philosophy by Jasper Adams (1837, Folsom, Wells, and Thurston of Cambridge, MA edition)

1793 births
1841 deaths
People from Medway, Massachusetts
19th-century American Episcopalians
Presidents of the College of Charleston
Brown University alumni
American military chaplains
People from Pendleton, South Carolina
United States Military Academy faculty
Fellows of the American Academy of Arts and Sciences
American geographers
19th-century American historians
19th-century American male writers
American ethicists
Historians from Massachusetts
19th-century geographers
19th-century American clergy
American male non-fiction writers
Presidents of Hobart and William Smith Colleges